Shipunovskaya is a rural locality (a village) in Shenkursky District, Arkhangelsk Oblast, Russia. The population was 531 as of 2010. There are 7 streets.

Geography 
Shipunovskaya is located 9 km west from Shenkursk (the district's administrative centre) by road. Vyselok Frushinsky is the nearest rural locality.

References 

Rural localities in Shenkursky District